Müşkür (known as Pavlovka until 1999) is a village and municipality in the Khachmaz Rayon of Azerbaijan. It has a population of 3,020.  The municipality consists of the villages of Müşkür, Müzəffəroba, and Müşviq.

In 1999, the neighbouring villages of Qasabovka and Yekaterinovka were incorporated into Müşkür.

References

Populated places in Khachmaz District